Hog Jaw is an unincorporated community in Marshall County, Alabama, United States.

References

Unincorporated communities in Marshall County, Alabama
Unincorporated communities in Alabama